The 1956–57 Kangaroo tour was the ninth Kangaroo tour, in which the Australian national rugby league team travelled to Great Britain and France and played twenty-eight matches, including the Ashes series of three Test matches against Great Britain and three Test matches against the French. It followed the tour of 1952-53 and the next was staged in 1959-60.

The squad's leadership 
The team was captained by Ken Kearney with Clive Churchill as vice-captain. Tour co-managers were Clarrie Fahy and Cyril Connell Sr. The latter's son, Cyril Connell Jr. was a playing member of the touring party.
In the three matches in which neither Kearney nor Churchill played, the Kangaroos were captained by Cyril Connell Jr.

Touring squad 
The Rugby League News published a photo and details of the touring team including the players' ages and weights. Various newspapers published the names of the touring squad when it was selected in September 1956. 
Match details - listing surnames of both teams and the point scorers - were included in E.E. Christensen's Official Rugby League Yearbook, as was a summary of the players' point-scoring. 
Banks, Connell, Davies, Doyle, Flannery, Furner, McGovern, Payne, Tyquin and Watson were selected from Queensland clubs. Adams and Marsh were selected from clubs in New South Wales Country areas. The balance of the squad had played for Sydney-based clubs during the 1956 season.

Match Results 
The tour began in Great Britain with a series a matches, but the first Test Match of the tour was played against France in Paris. The tourists returned to Great Britain for more matches against English clubs and a three Test Match series against Great Britain. The team then returned to France to play a Second and Third Test against France (the fifth and sixth Tests of the tour), plus matches against club and other representative teams.

1st Test vs France

1st Test vs Great Britain

2nd Test vs Great Britain

3rd Test vs Great Britain

2nd Test vs France

3rd Test vs France

References

External links 
 1956-57 Kangaroo Tour at Rugby League Project

Australia national rugby league team tours
Rugby league tours of Great Britain
Rugby league tours of France
Kangaroo tour
Kangaroo tour